Husen Castle (Burg Husen) is a medieval tower house of a castle in the Dortmund borough of Syburg in North Rhine-Westphalia.

The origins of the site go back to the 13th century. The present shape of the tower house dates to the 17th century. It is included in the monument inden of the city of Dortmund as a listed building.

The estate with its pastures and stands of trees that belongs to Syburg is about 7,000 m² in area and lies in the triangle formed by the cities of Dortmund, Schwerte and Hagen.

The Verband Christlicher Pfadfinderinnen und Pfadfinder (VCP) of Westphalia Land took over the castle in 1984 and uses it as a youth holiday home with and youth campsite.

External links 
 Information by the VCP of Westphalia Land on Husen Castle
 Information by the NRW foundation on Husen Castle

References 
 

Castles in North Rhine-Westphalia
Buildings and structures in Dortmund
Culture of North Rhine-Westphalia
County of Mark